Motor vehicle type approval is the method by which motor vehicles, vehicle trailers and systems, components and separate technical units intended for such vehicles achieve type approval in the European Union (EU). There is no EU approval body: authorized approval bodies of member states are responsible for type approval, which will be accepted in all member states.

History
This is outlined in framework directive Directive 2007/46/EC rules approval schemes of the new motor vehicles and their trailers in the European Union:

European Community Whole Vehicle Type Approval (ECWVTA), currently this applies to passenger cars. On 29 October 2012, ECWVTA was extended to cover all new road vehicles and their trailers.
United Nations Economic Commission for Europe (UNECE) regulations.
National Small Series Type Approval (NSSTA) - the key advantages of this scheme are that some technical requirements may be reduced in comparison with ECWVTA; however, the number of vehicles that can be manufactured are limited.
Individual Vehicle Approval (IVA)

The European Commission shall adopt amendments to this Directive which are necessary to lay down technical requirements for small series vehicles, vehicles approved under the individual approval procedure and 'special purpose vehicles'.

ECE Regulations to which the Community has acceded and which are listed in Part I of Annex IV and in Annex XI of the frame Directive are part of the EC type-approval of a vehicle in the same way as the separate directives or regulations. They shall apply to the categories of vehicles listed in this Annexes. When the Community has decided to apply on a compulsory basis a UNECE Regulation for the purpose of EC vehicle type-approval in accordance with Article 4(4) of Decision 97/836/EC, the annexes to the Frame Directive shall be amended as appropriate in accordance with the regulatory procedure with scrutiny referred to in Article 40(2). The UNECE Regulations listed in Part II of Annex IV are recognised as being equivalent to the corresponding separate directives or regulations in as much as they share the same scope and subject matter. Where the Community has decided to apply a new UNECE Regulation or a UNECE Regulation as amended, Part II of Annex IV shall be amended as appropriate.

Automotive EC Directives and ECE Regulations require third party approval - testing, certification and production conformity assessment by an independent body. Each member state is required to appoint an Approval Authority to issue the approvals, and a Technical Service to carry out the testing to the Directives and Regulations.

An approval issued by one Authority will be accepted in all the Member States. If a vehicle is produced in a very small quantity (e.g. M1 maximum 75 per year), single EU Member States can grant exception on a discretionary basis, however the validity of the Type Approval is limited to the boundaries of those Nations which concede to it.

Cornerstones of the Type Approval process are:
Application by the vehicle or component manufacturer
Testing by a technical service
Granting of the approval by an Approval Authority
Conformity of Production by the manufacturer in agreement with the Approval Authority
Certificate of Conformity by the manufacturer for the end-user

A particular country’s Type Approval may consist of one or more of the following forms:
Component Type Approval ─ approval of a component that may be fitted to any vehicle (e.g., seat belts, tires, lamps)
System Type Approval ─ approval of a set of components or a performance feature of a vehicle that can only be tested and certified in an installed condition (e.g., restraint system, brake system, lighting system)
Whole Vehicle Type Approval (WVTA) ─ approval of a vehicle in its entirety

There are multiple methods of type-approval:
multi-stage Type Approval: a procedure whereby one or more Member States certify that, depending on the state of completion, an incomplete or completed type of vehicle satisfies the relevant administrative provisions and technical requirements of this Directive
step-by-step Type Approval: a vehicle approval procedure consisting in the step-by-step collection of the whole set of EC type-approval certificates for the systems, components and separate technical units relating to the vehicle, and which leads, at the final stage, to the approval of the whole vehicle
mixed Type Approval: means a step-by-step Type Approval procedure for which one or more system approvals are achieved during the final stage of the approval of the whole vehicle, without it being necessary to issue the EC Type Approval certificates for those systems
single-step Type Approval: a procedure consisting in the approval of a vehicle as a whole by means of a single operation

EC Whole Vehicle Type Approval (also called Pan European Type Approval) is to prevent trade barriers, and at the same time guarantee the level of safety and restricted environmental influence of a vehicle. Thanks to that, the car can be registered in each European member state without additional national tests or approval. This harmonisation results in reduced costs and lead time for the manufacturer, importer as well as the consumer. Mandatory compliance date for ECWVTA for M1 vehicles was 2009-04-29. However cars that already have an ECWVTA but are imported from non EC countries often need to be re-approved when entering the EC.

In the United Kingdom, this function is performed by the Vehicle Certification Agency (VCA). This body has the power to issue International Organization for Standardization (ISO) certifications.

Electric vehicles 
Type approval for electric vehicles is governed by Regulation No 100 of the Economic Commission for Europe of the United Nations (UNECE) –
Uniform provisions concerning the approval of battery electric vehicles with regard to specific requirements for the construction, functional safety and hydrogen emission.

See also 
 Retrofitting
National Highway Traffic Safety Administration

References

External links
Importation and Certification FAQ’s (United States National Highway Traffic Safety Administration)
Vehicle type-approval in the European Union. Other Commission pages on motor vehicles:
 Competition
 Air Quality
 Transport.
Technical harmonisation for motor vehicles (European Union legislation)
Type Approval for road going vehicles in the European Community 
Vehicle Certification in Australia, Road Vehicle Certification System (RVCS).
  (Japan U.S. Environmental Protection Agency).
Vehicle Import
Resaffa Nogueira Martins, Henrique. Overview of Type Approval Homologation and Self Certification. DOI: 10.13140/RG.2.2.31708.39041

Product certification
Vehicle law